The ICAR-Central Citrus Research Institute (previously National Research Centre for Citrus) is an institute for research in citrus fruits and horticulture at Nagpur, Maharashtra. It is located at Nagpur in the state of Maharashtra. The city is famous for Mandarin oranges. The centre provides for research in the field of citrus agriculture; it also offers consultancy towards the field. It is a research institute under the Indian Council of Agricultural Research (ICAR) which is an autonomous body under the Ministry of Agriculture of the Indian Government.

History
Central India has appropriate conditions for growing citrus. The city of Nagpur and the region of Vidarbha produces the bulk of India's citrus tonnage, which is the fifth largest producer in the world.
In 1980, a task force appointed by the Ministry of Agriculture suggested the need of strengthening of research on citrus in central India after their survey during 24 to 26 April. Dr. D.J. Hutchison, and UNDP consultant on citrus recommended the establishment of Citrus Research Station at Nagpur to investigate problems concerning citrus fruits in the region. The Maharashtra state government also requested the Director General of Indian Council of Agricultural Research for the same. Similarly, quinquennial review team (QRT) of Indian Institute of Horticulture Research (IIHR), Bangalore furthered the  recommendation. Consequently, ICAR agreed for the establishment of the Research Station at Nagpur in VIth Plan.

Initially named the Central Citrus Research Station a committee constituted by ICAR selected suitable land at Nagpur and Government of Maharashtra agreed to provide the 100 hectares of land for the station to be established during VIIth Plan. The foundation stone was laid on 29 July 1985  formally by  P.V. Narasimha Rao, the then Minister of Defence. The Centre was functional from 29 November 1985.

The centre started functioned from part of the building of rabbit breeding centre of the Veterinary College at Seminary Hills, Nagpur which was under Dr. PDKV, Akola. Initially, pathology, entomology, horticulture and Post-harvest technology laboratories were established.

On 1 April 1986 the status of Central Citrus Research Station which was functioning under IIHR, Bangalore was upgraded to National Research Centre for Citrus with an outlay of Rs.74.00 lakhs in VII Plan. In 1996, the Centre was shifted from the building of rabbit breeding centre of the Veterinary College at Seminary Hills to present site at Amravati Road.

Mandate
The institute was  created amidst the so-called 'citrus decline' in India resulting in reduction in the cropped area under citrus. The 2030 Visio document for the institute notes that  of the erstwhile undergoing research activities at various universities  none was able to contribute to this important region as also that the research was not linked by any framework.

The newly created institute has now been the nodal body of citrus research in India. The National Mission on Citrus and concurrent research activities has allowed a concurrent doubling in yield in Maharashtra.

The initial mandate of the 'station' was limited:

Controversy

The centre has been accused by farmers to not having tested methods in a real farm. Its recommendation of chemicals (pesticides and fertilizers) has been criticized for its continued recommendations of the use of pesticides against the latent and now widespread Phytophthora fungus, which in the past threatened in tandem with such factors as low rainfall or drought, selection of non-robust mother plant for rootstock and a prolonged use of chemicals, a near complete wipeout of the Nagpur orange. The NRCC has insisted that experimental studies of organic vs chemical cultivation has produced no significant differences in its own run farms. The farmers differ by their experiences by media accounts, reporting robustness against the fungus and high yields after a switch to organic methods.

Ensuing the 1995-2005 drought In the NRCC warned the government in 2005 about the problem of nurseries stocking up on impure and undesirable rootstock varieties like galgal or (Kumaon lemon), the government did not do anything about it.

See also
ICAR (Indian Council on Agricultural Research), parent body to this Centre and other Research Centres and Institutes in various fields of agriculture and allied in India
About Institute

References 

Research institutes in Nagpur
Indian Council of Agricultural Research
Citrus farmers
1985 establishments in Maharashtra
Organizations established in 1985
Horticulture in India